Someday at Christmas is the eighth studio album by Stevie Wonder, first released on November 27, 1967 by Motown Records under its Tamla imprint. Produced by Henry Cosby, it marked Wonder's first Christmas album. Someday at Christmas consists of twelve tracks, featuring four cover versions of Christmas standards and carols, as well as eight original songs, chiefly penned by Ron Miller along with his wife Aurora as well as Bryan and Deborah Wells, including its title track and "What Christmas Means to Me". "Twinkle Twinkle Little Me" had been included two years earlier on The Supremes' Christmas album Merry Christmas.

Upon its original release, Someday at Christmas failed to chart in the United States, although it peaked at number 50 on the Swedish Albums Chart. It has since been reissued several times, most recently in 2003 as part of Universal Music's Christmas edition of their successful 20th Century Masters series, including additional tracks. In 2020, it peaked at number 28 on the US Top Holiday Albums. The title track "Someday at Christmas" was previously released as a single in 1966 and reached number 24 on Billboards Christmas Singles chart that year.

Critical reception

In his retrospective review for AllMusic, editor Rovi Staff wrote that "with Someday at Christmas, Stevie Wonder applies his inimitable vocal technique to yuletide songs, some familiar, some not, with predictably successful results. In the title song he yearns for a Christmas when "Men won't be boys/playing with bombs like kids play with toys," striking a plaintive tone not usually found on Christmas albums. Although he is hopeful that the day will come, he sings that it may not happen any time soon. The song seems eerily prescient in light of the chaotic year that would follow Christmas 1967, when this record was released."

Track listing
All tracks produced by Henry Cosby.

20th Century Masters (2003)

Personnel
Credits adapted from the album's liner notes.Performers and musicians'
 Stevie Wonder – vocals, harmonica, keyboards, piano, drums
 The Funk Brothers – instrumentation
 The Andantes – backing vocals
 The Originals – backing vocals

Charts

References

Stevie Wonder albums
1967 Christmas albums
Christmas albums by American artists
Tamla Records albums
Albums produced by Henry Cosby
Rhythm and blues Christmas albums
Albums recorded at Hitsville U.S.A.